Tetrorea sellata is a species of beetle in the family Cerambycidae. It was described by Sharp in 1882. It is known from New Zealand. It contains the varietas Tetrorea sellata var. maculata.

References

Desmiphorini
Beetles described in 1882